Stacie E. Goddard is an American political scientist. She is the Mildred Lane Kemper Professor of Political Science at Wellesley College. Goddard is known for her research on international order, grand strategy, and global power politics. Goddard currently serves as the Faculty Director of the Madeleine Korbel Albright Institute for Global Affairs and is a non-resident fellow of the Quincy Institute.

Biography 
Goddard earned a B.A. in Political Science from University of Chicago in 1996 and a Ph.D. from Columbia University in 2003. Her Ph.D. thesis was "Uncommon ground : the making of indivisible issues" 

She joined Wellesley College as an assistant professor in 2005 and became the Mildred Lane Kemper Professor of Political Science in 2020. She was awarded Wellesley College's highest teaching award, the Anna and Samuel Pinanski Teaching Prize, in 2011.

Academic work 
Her first book, Indivisible Territory and the Politics of Legitimacy: Jerusalem and Northern Ireland, argues that the legitimacy of Israeli historical narratives is used as a tool to secure territory.

Her most recent book, When Right Makes Might: Rising Powers and the Challenge to World Order challenges conventional international relations realist theories and argues that "great powers divine the intentions of their adversaries through rising powers’ legitimation strategies."

She has published essays and op-eds in various media outlets on topics related to U.S. foreign policy, including Foreign Policy, The New York Times, The Washington Post. Her articles have widely appeared in International Security, International Studies Quarterly, International Organization, International Theory, and Security Studies.

Goddard has held fellowships at the Security Studies Program at MIT, Harvard Kennedy School Belfer Center for Science and International Affairs. In 2019, she was a visiting fellow at the Ludwig Maximilian University of Munich.

Publications 

 When Right Makes Might: Rising Powers and the Challenge to World Order. Cornell University Press, 2018 
 Rhetoric and Grand Strategy. Edited with Ronald R. Krebs. special issue of Security Studies. 24 (1) (Spring 2015).
 Indivisible Territory and the Politics of Legitimacy: Jerusalem and Northern Ireland. New York: Cambridge University Press, 2010

References

External links 
 "What'd You Miss?," interview with Stacie Goddard on Bloomberg News. October 13, 2019.
 "The Return of Great Power Competition," panel discussion at CATO Institute. January 15, 2019
 "Challenges To Democracy," panel discussion with Madeleine Korbel Albright, Samantha Power, and Cass Sunstein at the Madeleine Korbel Albright Institute for Global Affairs.

Year of birth missing (living people)
Living people
American women political scientists
American political scientists
University of Chicago alumni
Columbia University alumni
Wellesley College faculty
American women academics
21st-century American women